The Atlantic Football League (AFL) is an amateur club-level Canadian football league that features four teams based in Atlantic Canada. The league is for players aged 18–24 that either attend universities without U Sports football programs or for players in the area. Since member teams operate as club teams (and not varsity teams), they do not receive funding from their universities. Some players eventually join U Sports programs and all Canadian players are eligible to join Canadian Football League teams.

On June 9, 2020, the league announced that they had cancelled the 2020 season due to the COVID-19 pandemic in Canada.

Season structure
There are currently four teams in league and each team plays six games with each team hosting the other once. All teams currently qualify for the playoffs with the top two seeds hosting the lower two. The winners of these games then qualify for the league championship game, the Moosehead Cup.

Teams

Active teams

Defunct teams

Championships

References

External links
Atlantic Football League

Canadian football leagues
Sport in the Maritimes
2009 establishments in Canada
Sports leagues established in 2009